Helga's Folly is an art nouveau boutique hotel situated in Kandy, Sri Lanka owned by Helga de Silva Blow Perera, daughter of Fredrick de Silva. Gregory Peck, Peter Finch, William Holden, Mahatma Gandhi, Vivien Leigh, Laurence Olivier, Jawaharlal Nehru, and Kelly Jones of the Stereophonics are some of the notable guests who stayed at the hotel. Jones went on to write and record the song "Madame Helga" after his stay at the hotel. Helga's Folly has been described as "insane, kind of creepy, but awesome at the same time."

History

Originally it was the family home of de Siva, designed by her mother, Esme de Silva in the 1930s.  In mid 1990s, de Silva inherited the hotel from her parents and renamed the hotel to Helga's Folly.

Accommodations
The hotel consists of eight superior rooms, eight deluxe rooms, eight  budget and one suite. The hotel self-designated as an 'anti-hotel' and decorated with antiques, objects of art, murals, and hundreds of family photographs.

See also
 List of hotels in Sri Lanka

References

External links
 , official website
 
 Helga's Folly on Tripadvisor

1960s establishments in Ceylon
Hotels in Kandy
Houses in Kandy
Hotels established in the 1960s